Nasirean Ethics ( Akhlāq-i Nāsirī) is a 13th century Persian book in philosophical ethics that is written by Khaje Nasir al-Din al-Tusi. This book is divided to three part: ethics, domestic economy and politics.

Author 

Nasir al-Din al-Tusi was Persian philosopher, mathematician, and theologian that was born into Shia family in Tus in 1201. He was of the Ismaili, and subsequently Twelver Shia Islamic belief. Nasir al-Din has about 150 works in different languages (Persian, Arabic).

Reason of writing 
At the end of thirteen century, Nasir al-Din al-Tusi wrote this book when he was in Quhistan to response to request of Nasir al-Din Abu al-Fath Abd al-Rahim ibn Abi Mansur, a Nizari Ismaili governor, for translating a famous Arabic book, Tahdhib al-Akhlaq, that was written by Miskawayh. The Miskawayh's book was about ethics but Nasir al-Din al-Tusi added the parts of domestic economy and politics of his work.

Content 
Akhlaq-i Nasiri has three parts. 

The first part is the Persian interpretation of Refinement of Morals (Tahdhib al-Akhlaq) of the earlier philosopher Miskawayh. The second part is about domestic economy and management of household affairs and contains the main mutual rights within the family as the most fundamental units of societies and the third part is about the political ideas of Nasir al-Din al-Tusi. In this part is seen the influence of Platonic, Neoplatonic and Aristotelian political ideas but also he mentioned to the ideas of Pre-Islamic rulers of Iran specially Achaemenid and Sasanian.

Influence over later books
Akhlaq-i Nasiri had influenced Jalaladdin Davani in Akhlaq-i Jalali, Hosayn Va'iz Kashifi in Akhlaq-i Mohseni and Mulla Mahdi Naraqi in Jame' al-Sa'adat.

See also 
 Hilyat al-Muttaqin
 Tahdhib al-Ahkam

References

Bibliography 
English translation of the book
 

Persian-language books
Philosophy books
Ethics books
13th-century books